"I Am Become Death" is part of a famous quotation from the Bhagavad Gita. The phrase may also refer to:
J. Robert Oppenheimer famously quoting the passage after witnessing the Trinity nuclear test
"I Am Become Death", an episode of the television drama Heroes
"I Am Become Death", a song by Joe Satriani from his self-titled EP